Aleksandar Khristov (born 28 July 1964) is a retired boxer from Bulgaria, who became world champion and represented his native country at the 1988 Summer Olympics in Seoul, South Korea. There he won the silver medal in the bantamweight (51 – 54 kg) division. He also won three medals in the European Amateur Boxing Championships, including gold at the 1987 European Amateur Boxing Championships in Turin, Italy.

Khristov was the winning boxer in a disputed bantamweight bout in the 1988 Seoul Olympics when he was given a controversial 4-1 victory over South Korean opponent Jung-Il Byun, who refused to leave the ring for over an hour after Khristov was given the verdict.

Results 
1985 European Championships
Defeated Hermann Leber (Austria) 5:0
Defeated Relu Nistor (Romania) 5:0
Defeated Jarmo Eskelinen (Finland) 5:0
Lost to Ljubiša Simić (Yugoslavia) 1:4

1987 European Championships
Defeated Mike Devanney (Scotland) RSC-3
Defeated Ljubiša Simić (Yugoslavia) 5:0
Defeated René Breitbarth (East Germany) 5:0
Defeated Yuriy Alexandrov (Soviet Union) 5:0

1988 Summer Olympics
Round of 64: Defeated Peter Anok (Sudan) by decision,4-1
Round of 32: Defeated Jung-Il Byun (South Korea) by decision, 4-1
Round of 16: Defeated Jimmy Majanya (Sweden) by decision, 5-0
Quarterfinal Defeated Alexander Artemev (Soviet Union) by decision, 3-2
Semifinal: Defeated Jorge Eliecer Julio (Colombia) by decision, 3-2
Final: Lost to Kennedy McKinney (United States) by decision, 0-5 (was awarded silver medal)

1996 Summer Olympics
Lost to Carlos Barreto (Venezuela) 3-9

References
 databaseOlympics.com
 

1964 births
Living people
Bantamweight boxers
Boxers at the 1988 Summer Olympics
Boxers at the 1996 Summer Olympics
Olympic boxers of Bulgaria
Olympic silver medalists for Bulgaria
Olympic medalists in boxing
Bulgarian male boxers
AIBA World Boxing Championships medalists
Medalists at the 1988 Summer Olympics